The members of the second National Assembly of South Korea were elected on 10 May 1950. The Assembly sat from 31 May 1950 until 30 May 1954.

Members

Seoul

Gyeonggi

North Chungcheong

South Chungcheong

North Jeolla

South Jeolla

North Gyeongsang

South Gyeongsang

Gangwon

Jeju

Notes

See also
 National Assembly (South Korea)#History

References

002
National Assembly members 002